The Intelligence and National Security Alliance (INSA) is a non-profit, nonpartisan 501(c)(6) professional organization based in Arlington, Virginia for the public and private sector members of the United States Intelligence Community.

History 

INSA was founded in 1979 as the Security Affairs Support Association (SASA) to bring together professionals in the intelligence field, primarily focused on the National Security Agency, and to assist members in staying current on intelligence and national security community issues. SASA's headquarters were in Annapolis Junction, Maryland. Maj Gen John E. Morrison, Jr., a 2001 NSA Hall of Honor Inductee, served as president of SASA from 1979 to 1999.

SASA's Board of Directors voted in November 2005 to rename the organization the Intelligence and National Security Alliance (INSA) in order to broaden its reach across the intelligence and national security communities and better serve the community in the period following the establishment of the Office of the Director of National Intelligence.

Mission 

INSA is the premier intelligence and national security organization that provides a unique venue for collaboration, networking, and the examination of policy issues and solutions. Representing an unprecedented alliance among senior leaders from the public, private, and academic sectors, INSA members form an unparalleled community of experts that collaborate to develop creative, innovative and timely solutions to the intelligence and national security issues facing the United States.

INSA works to promote and recognize the highest standards within the national security and intelligence communities.INSA members include current and former high-ranking intelligence, military and government agency leaders, analysts, and experts from industry and academia. Drawing on the experience and expertise of this membership, the Intelligence and National Security Alliance provides the thought leadership that identifies crucial intelligence topics, completes strategic research and promotes innovative solutions.

INSA has approximately 150 corporate members, as well as over one-thousand individual members, who are industry leaders within the government, private sector, and academia.

The current president is Ambassador Joseph Trani, who has served as the senior advisor to the director of national intelligence (DNI), the director of the National Counterproliferation Center (NCPC) and the National Intelligence Manager for Counterproliferation (CP). Prior to his work at the ODNI, DeTrani served at the Department of State as the Special Envoy for the Six-Party Talks with North Korea and at the Central Intelligence Agency (CIA) as director for East Asia, director for Europe, director of technical services, director of public affairs, director of the CIA Crime and Narcotics Center, and executive assistant to the director of Central Intelligence. Previously, the INSA presidency was filled by Ellen McCarthy, who left INSA in 2012 to become COO of the National Geospatial-Intelligence Agency.

John Negroponte has served as chairman of INSA's Board of Directors since January 2013. Previously, the position was filled by Frances Townsend, former Homeland Security Advisor to President George W. Bush, John O. Brennan who left INSA in 2008 to become deputy national security advisor to President Barack Obama, and Vice-Admiral John Michael McConnell, who left upon his confirmation as the Director of National Intelligence.

INSA's internal operational structure consists of the main office and its personnel, along with several member-driven, volunteer councils and Task Forces that examine specific areas of study within the IC.

Councils and task forces 

INSA's Councils and Task Forces reflect INSA's mission to facilitate collaboration between the public and private sectors for non-partisan, practical solutions to our national security challenges. INSA's Councils and Task Forces produce white papers, testimony and expert-level answers to policy requests from the White House, the National Security Council, the ODNI, the Pentagon and various Executive Branch agencies and Congressional Committees.

As of April 2012, INSA Councils and Task Forces included:

 Cyber Council
 IC ITE - Doing in Common What is Commonly Done A .pdf version of this white paper produced in February 2013
 Cloud Computing: Risks, Benefits, and Mission Enhancement for the Intelligence Community A .pdf version of this white paper produced in March 2012
 Cyber Intelligence: Setting the landscape for an emerging discipline A .pdf version of this white paper produced in September 2011
 Addressing Cyber Security Through Public - Private Partnership: An Analysis of Existing Models A .pdf version of this white paper produce in November 2009
 Homeland Security Intelligence Council
 Intelligence to Protect the Homeland: Taking Stock Ten Years Later and Looking Ahead A .pdf version of this white paper produced in September 2011
 Maturing the Homeland Security Intelligence Enterprise A .pdf version of this white paper produced in September 2011
 Homeland Security Analysis The Knowledge Ecosystem A .pdf version of this white paper produced in September 2011
 Council on Technology and Innovation
 Emerging Science and Technologies: Securing the Nation through Discovery and Innovation A .pdf version of this white paper produced in April 2013
 SMART Change Task Force
 SMART Change: Lessons of the Past, Direction for the Future A .pdf version of this white paper produced in May 2011
 Security Policy Reform Council
 Next Steps for Security Reform: Industry Proposals to Enhance Efficiency and Reduce Costs in National Security Contracts A .pdf version of this white paper produced in December 2011
 Rebalance Task Force
 Expectations of Intelligence in the Information Age A .pdf version of this white paper produced in December 2012
 White Paper Library

Intelligence Community outreach efforts 

INSA hosts numerous events annually for professionals in the intelligence and national security communities. Foremost among these is the William Oliver Baker Award Dinner, which honors outstanding individuals in the fields of intelligence and domestic security.

In December 2010, the INSA Board of Directors established and presented the first Annual INSA Achievement Awards, which honor five young members and one senior member of the intelligence and national security community for their distinguished service to the country and their field. These talented young professionals are selected for their leadership, mission accomplishments, potential for growth, and their emerging professional standing and influence. The INSA Board named the Achievement Awards in honor of former William Oliver Baker Award recipients. The Awards are:

 Sidney D. Drell Academic Award
 Richard J. Kerr Government Award
 Edwin H. Land Industry Award
 John W. Warner Homeland Security Award
 William O. Studeman Military Award
 Joan A. Dempsey Mentoring Award

In addition to these annual award events, INSA hosts several events with prominent speakers from across the Intelligence Community on a regular basis, including the Distinguished Speakers Series, Intelligence Champions Events, Leadership Dinners, and the speaker series "An Evening with Charlie Allen." Nearly all INSA events are held in the Washington metropolitan area.

INSA also hosts an annual "IC Industry Day" to discuss key issues relevant to the Intelligence Community. INSA developed its annual IC Industry Day in conjunction with the Office of the Director of National Intelligence (ODNI) as a comprehensive forum for Intelligence Community leaders to relay their budget priorities to the industry with the goal of better enabling industry to anticipate and provide multifaceted support to the IC. Past topics have ranged from “Intelligence Program Priorities in a Budget Constrained Environment” (2013) to “Understanding the IC Budget in Order to Meet National Security Need" (2012).

INSA's individual members includes former government officials from the National Security Council, National Intelligence Council, Office of the Director of Central Intelligence, Department of State, Department of Defense, Central Intelligence Agency, Department of Homeland Security, Bureau of Alcohol, Tobacco and Firearms, and the WMD Commission.

William Oliver Baker Award 

The William Oliver Baker Award was originally established by SASA in 1984 in honor of the first award recipient, William O. Baker, to promote excellence in the intelligence and national security activities of the United States government and associated endeavors in the private sector. The Award annually recognizes individuals for exceptional achievements and sustained contributions or single achievements of extraordinary merit. Past and current recipients by year include:

References

External links 
 INSA website
 Ambassador Joseph DeTrani Named President Of INSA, WashingtonExec, February 8, 2013
 Shane Harris, Intelligence File: ADVICE+DISSENT: Gimme an S-P-Y", Government Executive magazine, May 15, 2007

Nonpartisan organizations in the United States
Non-profit organizations based in Arlington, Virginia
Organizations established in 2005